"You Are My Destiny" is a song written and performed by Paul Anka. It was recorded in September 1957 and released in late fall 1957, reaching number seven on the US Billboard 100 early in 1958, number fourteen on the R&B chart, and number two in Canada. The song was also released in the UK, where it reached number six.

Charts

Cover Versions
The same year of the Paul Anka release, Dalida released a French version called "Tu m'étais destinée". 
In 1959, the Argentine vocal group Los Cinco Latinos released a Spanish version under the title "Tu eres mi destino".
In 1975, French artist Guy Bonnardot released a French version as the B-side of "Oui, Je Suis Fou D'amour (Crazy Love)" on EMI Pathé.
For the 2007 album Classic Songs, My Way, Anka re-recorded the song as a duet with Michael Bublé.
In 2009, Greek artist Vassilikos released his own cover of the song in his debut solo album "Vintage: Songs I Wish I Had Written".

See also
My Destiny (disambiguation)

References

1958 singles
Paul Anka songs
Songs written by Paul Anka
1958 songs